David Ambler may refer to:

 David Ambler (athlete) (born 1989), New Zealand sprinter
 David Ambler (rower) (born 1997), British rower